Ruaridh McConnochie (born 23 October 1991) is a Scottish rugby union player. He was a member of the silver medal winning team in Rugby sevens at the 2016 Summer Olympics, and a full England International, making his debut against Italy at St James's Park in September 2019.
He wasn't selected to play again for England since, and as a result has become eligible to play for Scotland through his Scottish parents. His great grandfather James Macdonald  represented Scotland in football and his grandfather Hamish Macdonald was a scratch golfer and a member of the R&A in St Andrews.

Youth
McConnochie attended Cranbrook School, Kent, where he played for the school's 1st XV rugby union team.
McConnochie played rugby at the University of Gloucestershire, as well as playing for Nuneaton RFC between 2012 and 2014 before joining Hartpury College.

England sevens
During his days at Hartpury, McConnochie made his England Sevens debut at the 2015 Dubai Sevens, adding to his GB Student Sevens appearance where he won the World University Sevens Championship.
He was a silver Olympic medallist with Great Britain at the Rio 2016 Summer Olympics and World Cup finalist with England. A regular try-scorer in the World Rugby Sevens Series, a year later, Ruaridh played an integral role in England’s gold medal triumph in Cape Town in December 2016. He also touched down in the 14-12 quarter-final win over New Zealand in Vancouver in March 2017 on the way to England’s gold medal success.

England national team 
On 31 January 2018, McConnochie signed a professional contract with top English club Bath in the Aviva Premiership from the 2018-19 season.

In June 2019 he was one of four uncapped players named in England's preliminary World Cup training squad. Eddie Jones named McConnochie in the starting line-up to play Wales in England's first warm-up game but had to withdraw from the line-up with a hip injury, however, he was still named in Jones' 31-man squad. McConnochie was also named in the second warm-up against Wales before again pulling out through injury.

McConnochie was eligible to play for Scotland through his Scottish father, but elected instead to play for his country of birth, England. He finally earned his full England cap on 6 September 2019 against Italy. McConnochie started on the wing, playing 51 minutes before being replaced by Bath teammate Joe Cokanasiga. The winger recorded his first International points, a try, during the first half of England's comfortable Rugby World Cup 2019 group stage win over the USA.

Scotland national team
In January 2023, McConnochie was included on the Scotland squad for the 2023 Six Nations Championship.  He became eligible for Scotland under World Rugby rule allowing a change to another country for which he qualifies once more than three years have elapsed since his last match for England.

References

External links
 

1991 births
Living people
Alumni of the University of Gloucestershire
Commonwealth Games bronze medallists for England
Commonwealth Games medallists in rugby sevens
England international rugby union players
English people of Scottish descent
English rugby union players
Great Britain national rugby sevens team players
Medalists at the 2016 Summer Olympics
Olympic medalists in rugby sevens
Olympic rugby sevens players of Great Britain
Olympic silver medallists for Great Britain
Rugby sevens players at the 2016 Summer Olympics
Rugby sevens players at the 2018 Commonwealth Games
Rugby union players from Lambeth
Medallists at the 2018 Commonwealth Games